This is a list of airlines that have an air operator's certificate issued by the Agence Nationale de l'Aviation Civile of Burkina Faso.

See also 

List of defunct airlines of Burkina Faso
List of airlines
List of companies based in Burkina Faso

References

 
Airlines
Burkina Faso
Airlines
Burkina Faso